Madha Engineering College (MEC) is a one-campus school for engineering located in Kunrathur, Chennai, India. It was founded in 1998. The College is one of the institutions belonging to the Madha Group of Educational Institutions. The college campus is often used as movie shooting locations.

In film
The college is featured in the following movies: -
Manmadhan (2004)
 London  (2005)
Kedi (2006)
Aadhi (2006)
 Thimiru  (2006)
 Mr. Local  (2019)

External links

Madha Group of Academic Institutions

Engineering colleges in Chennai
1998 establishments in Tamil Nadu